Nissan has designed, assembled and/or sold the following vehicles. The main markets column are meant to roughly show which region the vehicle is targeted to, and where roughly the car is currently being on sale. It might not accurately show the countries where the vehicle is being on sale.

Current models

Passenger vehicles

Light commercial vehicles

Heavy commercial vehicles

Discontinued Datsun vehicles 
 1914 Dat Type 31
 1921 Dat Lila
 1930 Dat Type 91
 1931 Datsun Type 10
 1932 Datsun Type 11
 1932–1941 Datsun Roadster
 1933 Datsun Type 12
 1934–1935 Datsun Type 13
 1934–1935 Datsun 13T Pickup
 1935–1936 Datsun Type 14
 1935–1936 Datsun 14T Pickup
 1936 Datsun NL-75
 1936 Datsun NL-76
 1936–1937 Datsun Type 15
 1936–1938 Datsun 15T Pickup
 1937–1938 Datsun Type 16
 1937–1944 Datsun 17T Pickup
 1938–1940 Datsun Type 17
 1946–1947 Datsun 1121 Pickup
 1946–1949 Datsun 2124 Pickup
 1947–1948 Datsun DA
 1948–1954 Datsun DB Series
 1948 Datsun DB
 1949–1950 Datsun DB-2
 1951–1952 Datsun DB-4
 1953 Datsun DB-5
 1954 Datsun DB-6
 1949–1950 Datsun 3135 Pickup
 1950–1951 Datsun DW Series
 1950 Datsun DW-2
 1951 Datsun DW-4
 1950–1951 Datsun 4146 Pickup
 1950–1954 Datsun DS Series
 1950–1951 Datsun DS
 1951 Datsun DS-2
 1951–1952 Datsun DS-4
 1953 Datsun DS-5
 1954 Datsun DS-6 Convar
 1950–1986 Datsun Patrol
 1951–1953 Datsun 5147 Pickup
 1952 Datsun DC-3
 1953–1954 Datsun 6147 Pickup
 1955–1957 Datsun 120 Pickup
 1955–1986 Datsun Truck
 1957–1961 Datsun 220 Pickup
 1959–1970 Datsun Sports
 1961–1965 Datsun 320 Pickup
 1962–1970 Datsun 1500, 1600, 2000 Roadster
 1962–1986 Datsun Bluebird
 1979–1986 Datsun Bluebird 910
 1965–1972 Datsun 520 Pickup
 1965–1985 Datsun Sunny
 1965–1969 Datsun Sunny/1000/B10
 1971–1973 Datsun Sunny/1200/B110
 1974–1977 Datsun Sunny/120Y/B210
 1978–1982 Datsun Sunny/120Y/140Y/B310
 1982–1985 Datsun/Nissan Sunny/B11
 1968–1973, 1978–1981 Datsun 510 Sedan
 1970–1973 Datsun 240Z
 1970–1974 Datsun 100A
 1970–1976 Datsun 1200 Sedan
 1970–1982 Datsun Cherry
 1971–1975 Datsun 610
 1971–1979 Datsun 240C
 1971–1979 Datsun 260C
 1972–1977 Datsun 200L
 1973–1977 Datsun 140J
 1973–1977 Datsun 710
 1973–1979 Datsun 620 "Bulletside" pickup
 1973–1979 Datsun 23J Special
 1974 Datsun 260Z
 1974–1978 Datsun F-10
 1974–1983 Datsun B-210
 1974–1983 Datsun 200SX
 1975–1978 Datsun 280Z
 1976–1978 Datsun 180B/180B SSS
 1977–1981 Datsun 810
 1977–1981 Datsun 200B/200B SSS
 1978–1982 Datsun 210
 1978–1982 Datsun 310
 1978–1983 Datsun 280C
 1973–1983 Datsun Urvan
 1979–1983 Datsun 280ZX
 1979–1984 Datsun 720 Pickup
2014–2020 Datsun on-Do
2015–2020 Datsun mi-Do
2018–2020 Datsun Cross
2014–2022 Datsun Go
2014–2022 Datsun Go+
2016–2022 Datsun redi-Go

Discontinued Nissan vehicles

 1937–1943 Nissan Type 70 (based on the Graham Paige Crusader)
 1937–1941 Nissan 80 Truck (based on the Graham Paige truck)
 1937–1941 Nissan 90 Bus
 1939–1941 Nissan Type 50
 1941 Nissan Type 30
 1941 Nissan Type 53
 1941–1952 Nissan 180 Truck (based on the 1937–1941 Chevrolet 133/158 trucks)
 1941–1949 Nissan 190 Bus
 1949-1951 Nissan 290 Bus
 1952–1953 Nissan 380 Truck
 1952-1953 Nissan 390 Bus
 1953–1955 Nissan 480 Truck
1955 Nissan 482 Truck
 1953–1955 Nissan 490 Bus
 1955 Nissan 492 Bus
 1955–1958 Nissan 580 Truck
 1958–1959 Nissan 582 Truck
 1955–1958 Nissan 590 Bus
 1958–1959 Nissan 592 Bus
 1956–1982 Nissan Junior Pickup
 1957–1981 Nissan Caball
 1957–2001 Nissan Bluebird
 1958–1964 Nissan Cablight
 1959-? Nissan U-R Bus
 1959–1968 Nissan 680 Truck
 1959–1972 Nissan 690 Bus
 1959–1970 Nissan Fairlady
 1960–2004 Nissan Cedric/Gloria
 1965–1968, 1974–2002 Nissan Silvia/180SX/200SX/240SX
 1965–1997 Nissan Homy
 1965–2010 Nissan President
 1986–1991 Nissan Sunny/B12
 1965–2006 Nissan Sunny
 1966–1967 Nissan Prince Royal
 1966–1976 Nissan C80
 1968 Nissan R380
 1968–1969 Nissan 681 Truck
 1968–1975 Nissan Cabstar
 1968–2002, 2014 Nissan Laurel
 1969–1976 Nissan 780 Truck
 1969 Nissan R381
 1970 Nissan R382
 1970 Nissan R383
 1970–1986 Nissan Cherry
1971–2021 Nissan Civilian
 1977–1992 Nissan Stanza
 1986–1988 Nissan Stanza Wagon
 1982–1986 Nissan Violet
 1977–2002 Nissan 200SX (Silvia)
 1978–2010 Nissan Vanette
 1987–1990 Nissan Vanette#Second generation 
 1979–1988 Nissan Gazelle
 1980–1999 Nissan Leopard (also sold as the Infiniti J30)
 1982–2004 Nissan Multi
 1984–1987 Nissan 300C
 1984–1989 Nissan 300ZX Z31 (Fairlady Z in Japan)
 1984–1989 Nissan Auster
 1985 Nissan GTP ZX-Turbo
 1985–1986 Nissan 720 Pickup
 1986–1990 Nissan T12/T72
 1986–1992 Nissan Pintara
 1986–2002 Nissan Terrano
 1986.5–1997 Nissan Hardbody Truck
 1987–2015 Nissan Cedric Y31
 1988 Nissan R88C
 1988–1998 Nissan Largo
 1988–2003 Nissan Cefiro (also sold as the Infiniti I)
 1988–2010, 2012–2022 Nissan Cima
 1989 Nissan Be-1
 1989 Nissan Pao
 1989 Nissan R89C
 1989–1992 Nissan S-Cargo
 1989–1998 Nissan 180SX (branded as 200SX in Europe)
 1989–1998 Nissan 240SX (JPN S13 and S14)
 1990 Nissan Axxess
 1990 Nissan NPT-90
 1990 Nissan R90C
 1990–1992 Nissan Presea R10
 1990–1999 Nissan 300ZX Z32 (Fairlady Z in Japan)
 1990–2003 Nissan Avenir (Expert)
 1990–2008 Nissan Primera
 1991 Nissan Figaro
 1991 R91CP
 1991 Nissan Saurus Jr.
 1991–1996 Nissan NX
 1991–1996 Nissan 100NX
 1992 R92CP
 1993–2002, 2004–2009, 2011–2016 Nissan Quest
 1993–2006 Nissan Terrano II
 1993–2009 Nissan Crew
 1994–1996 Nissan Presea R11
 1994–2000 Nissan Rasheen
 1994–2005 Nissan Wingroad
 1995–1998 Nissan 200SX (US 2-door Sentra coupe)
 1996–2007 Nissan Stagea
 1997–1998 Nissan R390 GT1
 1997–2001 Nissan R'nessa
 1998–2019 Nissan Cube
 1999 Nissan R391
 1999–2001 Nissan Hypermini
 1999–2003 Nissan Bassara
 2000–2015 Nissan Xterra
 2001–2009 Nissan Platina (rebadged Renault Clio)
 2001–2016 Nissan Moco (rebadged Suzuki MR Wagon, a Keicar)
 2003–2008 Nissan 350Z Z33 (Fairlady Z in Japan)
 2005–2013 Nissan Otti (rebadged Mitsubishi eK)
 2007–2011 Nissan Clipper Rio (rebadged Mitsubishi Town Box)
 2007–2010 Nissan Pino (rebadged Suzuki Alto)
 2008–2012 Nissan Kix (rebadged Mitsubishi Pajero Mini)
 2009–2020 Nissan 370Z
 2009–2013 Nissan Pixo (rebadged Suzuki Alto)
2011–2021 Nissan NV
2018–2021 Nissan NV250

References

External links
Early Datsun website

Nissan